Russia's War: Blood upon the Snow is a ten-part British-Russian television documentary series that explores the involvement of the Soviet Union in World War 2 while under Joseph Stalin's reign of terror, highlighting the suffering of the general population, members of the Red Army and anyone that Stalin thought might pose a threat to his power. 

The series was released in 1995, not long after the collapse of the Soviet Union in 1991, an event that allowed Western and Russian historians access to formerly secret Soviet archives for the first time so that the events on the Eastern Front could be better explained to Western audiences. 

The series is narrated by English actor Nigel Hawthorne and the credits name "Professor Richard Overy", "Professor Dmitri Volkogonov" and "Professor Mikhail Semyryaga" as Historical Consultants. Although Volkogonov did publish books on Soviet history and had extensive access to the archives, it appears that the title "Professor" is honorary as it appears he did not work at a university.

Episodes 

<onlyinclude>

Criticism 
Dr. Nick Baron an Associate Professor at the Faculty of Arts, University of Nottingham writes:

He suggests it is simplistic to say Stalin was an evil genius and that the population not sent to the gulag or the front was held in thrall by propaganda.

He notes some errors where the visual footage does not match what is being described, imprecise chronology, quotes used out of context and some mistranslations.

However, he concludes

Books
After the television series was released, the book Russia's War: Blood Upon The Snow, was published in hardback but renamed as Russia's War: A History of the Soviet Effort: 1941-1945 in paperback.

References

External links
Playlist of episodes on YouTube

1990s documentary television series
Documentary television series about World War II
British documentary television series
Works about Russian history